John Gray may refer to:

Politics and government
John Gray (North Carolina politician), American politician, member of the North Carolina General Assembly of 1777
John C. Gray (1783–1823), United States representative from Virginia
John Gray (socialist) (1799–1883), English economic pamphleteer, utopian socialist, and exponent of Ricardian economics
John Gray (New Zealand politician) (1801–1859), member of the New Zealand Parliament
John Hamilton Gray (Prince Edward Island politician) (1811–1887), Canadian politician, Premier of Prince Edward Island
John Hamilton Gray (New Brunswick politician) (1814–1889), Canadian politician, Premier of New Brunswick
Sir John Gray (Irish politician) (1815–1875), Irish Member of Parliament for Kilkenny, 1865–1875
John Gray (Wisconsin politician, born 1817) (1817–?), American politician, member of the Wisconsin State Assembly
John Gray (Ontario politician) (1837–1917), Canadian politician, member of the Legislative Assembly of Ontario
John Gray (New South Wales politician) (1841–1914), Australian senator
John S. Gray (Idaho politician) (1851–1902), American politician, Lieutenant Governor of Idaho
John Gray (Victorian politician, died 1925) (c. 1853–1925), Australian politician, member of the Victorian Legislative Assembly
John Gray (North Dakota politician) (1877–1952), American politician, North Dakota State Treasurer
John Austin Gray (1892–1939), Australian politician, member of the Victorian Legislative Assembly
John R. Gray (politician) (1925−1996), American politician, member of the Wisconsin State Assembly
Sir John Gray (diplomat) (1936–2003), British diplomat
John Gray (Oshawa politician) (born 1959), former mayor of Oshawa, Ontario, Canada

Law and crime
John Gray (barrister) (1807–1875), British barrister and legal writer
John Chipman Gray (1839–1915), American law professor and legal scholar
John Clinton Gray (1843–1915), American judge in New York
John Joe Gray (born 1950), fugitive from the law in Trinidad, Texas, United States

Military
John Gray (American Revolutionary War soldier) (1764–1868), U.S. soldier, said to be the longest surviving veteran of the war
John Gray (Medal of Honor) (1836–1887), Medal of Honor recipient in the American Civil War
Sir John Gray (Royal Navy officer) (1913–1998), British admiral
John P. Gray (naval officer) (1914–1942), United States Navy officer, pilot, and Navy Cross recipient

Arts and humanities
John Gray (1811–1891), Scottish engineer and philanthropist for whom the Gray's School of Art is named
John Miller Gray (1850–1894), Scottish art critic and curator
John Gray (poet) (1866–1934), English poet and Catholic priest
John Gray (mythologist) (1913–2000), Scottish author of books on history and mythology
John Gray (philosopher) (born 1948), British philosopher
John Gray (American author) (born 1951), American author best known for his book Men Are from Mars, Women Are from Venus
John Gray (Canadian author), Canadian journalist and biographer
John Gray (museum administrator), American museum director

Religion
John Gray (Episcopalian minister) (1646–1717), minister of the Episcopal Church of Scotland
John Gray (Scottish bishop) (1817–1872), Roman Catholic vicar apostolic for Western Scotland
John Gray (archdeacon of Hong Kong) (1823–1890), Archdeacon of Hong Kong
John R. Gray (minister) (1913–1984), Moderator of the General Assembly of the Church of Scotland in 1977
John Gray (New Zealand bishop) (1947–2015), New Zealand Anglican bishop

Science, medicine and technology
John Gray (mathematician) (died 1769), Scottish mathematician, author and Rector of Aberdeen University
John Edward Gray (1800–1875), British zoologist
John Franklin Gray (1804–1881), American educator and physician, first practitioner of homeopathy in the United States
John Gray (locomotive engineer), locomotive superintendent of the London Brighton and South Coast Railway, 1845–1847
John P. Gray (psychiatrist) (1825–1886), American psychiatrist
John McFarlane Gray (1831–1908), Scottish engineer
John H. Gray (economist) (1859–1946), American economist
Sir John Gray (physiologist) (1918–2011), British physiologist
John Stuart Gray (1941–2007), British-Norwegian marine biologist

Business
John Gray (Canadian banker) (c. 1755–1829), president of the Bank of Montreal
John Gray, British founder of Gray and Davison pipe organ builders in 1841
John S. Gray (businessman) (1841–1906), Scottish-born American candymaker, businessman, and first president of Ford Motor Company
John Gray (British banker) (1934–2009), British banker

Sport
John Gray (Australian footballer) (1888–1947), Australian rules footballer for Melbourne University FC and medical doctor
John Gray (runner, born 1894) (1894–1942), American Olympic runner
John Gray (boxer) (1906–1964), Filipino Olympic boxer
Johnny Gray (baseball) (1926–2014), American baseball pitcher
John Gray (English sportsman) (born 1948), English cricketer, and rugby union and rugby league footballer
John Gray (ice hockey) (born 1949), Canadian ice hockey player
Johnny Gray (born 1960), American runner

Broadcasting and entertainment
John MacLachlan Gray (born 1946), Canadian playwright, composer, and performer
John Gray (director), American writer and director
John J. Gray, American television writer and producer
John Gray, television news anchor on WXXA-TV in Albany, New York

Ships
MV John Hamilton Gray, Canadian icebreaking railway, vehicle, and passenger ferry
USS John P. Gray (APD-74), United States Navy high-speed transport

Other
John Gray (master mariner) (1819–1872), British captain of the SS Great Britain
John Gray (nightwatchman) (died 1858), owner of Greyfriars Bobby
John E. Gray (1907–2002), American educational administrator and businessman, president of Lamar University
John Hunter Gray (1934–2019), American sociologist and civil rights activist

See also
Jon Gray (born 1991), American baseball player
John de Gray (died 1214), Bishop of Norwich
John Grey (disambiguation)
Jonathan Gray (disambiguation)
Jack Gray (disambiguation)